This article lists the squads of the women's field hockey competition at the 2022 Commonwealth Games, which will be held in Birmingham, England from 29 July to 8 August 2022.

Pool A

Canada
The squad was announced on 4 July 2022.

Head coach: Robert Short

England
The squad was announced on 14 June 2022.

Head coach:  David Ralph

Ghana
Head coach: Ghazanfar Ali

India
The squad was announced on 23 June 2022.

Head coach:  Janneke Schopman

Wales
The squad was announced on 15 June 2022.

Head coach: Kevin Johnson

Pool B

Australia
The squad was announced on 11 June 2022.

Head coach: Katrina Powell

Kenya
Head coach: Jacqueline Mwangi

New Zealand
The squad was announced on 9 June 2022.

Head coach: Darren Smith

Scotland
The squad was announced on 13 June 2022.

Head coach: Chris Duncan

South Africa
The squad was announced on 8 June 2022.

Head coach: Giles Bonnet

References

External links
Official Website

squads
2022 in women's field hockey